Shortlands is a suburb of South East London, England, within the London Borough of Bromley. It has been part of Greater London since 1965, and was previously part of the historic county of Kent. It is located between Beckenham and Bromley, to the north of Park Langley.

History
The earliest known settlement in the area was an Iron Age hillfort at Toots Wood, where traces of a Roman Camp and pottery has also been found. Dr Peter D. Moore has performed a pollen analysis at the site which suggest that the site was abandoned before the beginning of the Roman occupation.

Historically, Shortlands was known as Clay Hill. In medieval times the areas consisted of sets of long and short fields, called Longelonds and Shortelonds, the latter ultimately giving its name to Shortlands House (later converted into a hotel, and now a part of Bishop Challoner School) which was built at the start of the 18th century. The house with its extensive farmland was acquired in 1848 by a railway magnate William Wilkinson, who also built several cottages for his farm labourers. Housing development began in the 1860s with the sale of the Shortlands House estate, spurred by the opening of Shortlands railway station in 1858. The housing along Westmoreland Road largely dates to the 1880s, with further development occurring in the 20th century.

Pearson & Cox was a British automobile manufacturer in Shortlands, trading from 1908 to 1916. In 1913 they manufactured both steam-powered vehicles (cars and bicycles) and petrol powered cyclecars.

In 1921, a war memorial, designed by W. D. Caroe in the form of a Celtic cross, was unveiled in the village, in the middle of a road junction. On 8 July 2016, a Mini car collided with the memorial, breaking it into pieces. The memorial was restored in October 2017 and re-positioned on its site.

Shortlands is today a quiet, prosperous suburb. There is a library on Shortlands Road and a small row of shops by the railway station.

Transport

Rail
Shortlands station is in Travelcard Zone 4 of Transport for London’s zonal fare system, and serves the area with National Rail services to London Victoria via Herne Hill, as well as  Orpington. Shortlands is also served by Thameslink to London Blackfriars via Catford, (during peak hours these trains continue to Luton via St Pancras International); as well as to Sevenoaks via Swanley. As of 2019, the station also houses a coffee shop, snack retailer and dry cleaners.

Buses
Shortlands is served by London Buses routes 162, 227, 354, 358 367 & N3. These connect it with areas including Beckenham, Bromley, Bromley Common, Locksbottom, Farnborough, Green Street Green, Keston, Park Langley, Eden Park, Chislehurst, Bickley, Eltham, New Eltham, Croydon, Shirley, Addiscombe, Crystal Palace, Elmers End, Anerley, Penge and Orpington.

Route 162, and the N3 night bus between Oxford Circus and Bromley North serve Shortlands via Hayes Lane at the Scotts Lane, Den Close and Hayes Lane/Kingswood Road bus stops.

The nearest Tramlink station is Beckenham Junction, which serves the western termini Wimbledon, as well as Mitcham Junction, West Croydon and East Croydon stations.

Education
The main schools in Shortlands are Valley Primary School, Highfield Infant and Junior Schools, Harris Academy Shortlands, Clare House Primary School and Bishop Challoner School.

Sports and leisure
Beccehamians RFC, a Rugby Union Club founded in 1933, plays competitive rugby at Sparrows Den at the bottom of Corkscrew Hill near West Wickham.

Notable people
 Enid Blyton (1897-1968), children's author, commemorated by a blue plaque on 83 Shortlands Road where she lived part of her life.
 Harold Bride (1890-1956), the wireless operator aboard , lived at 58 Ravensbourne Avenue from 1903 - 1922, commemorated by a blue plaque on the property.
 Sir John Brown (1816–1896), Victorian-era industrialist, died at Shortlands House.
 Grahame Clark (1907–1995), archaeologist who specialised in Mesolithic Europe and palaeoeconomics, grew up in Shortlands.
 Dinah Craik (1826–1887), novelist, lived and died in Shortland. 
 John Ossian Davies (1851–1916), the Welsh Congregationalist minister, died here.
 Thomas Charles Dewey (1840-1926), President of the Prudential Assurance Company and philanthropist, commemorated by a blue plaque on 1 South Hill Road where he lived for much of his life.
 George Grote (1794–1871), eminent historian of Greece, was born here at Shortlands House when it was known as Clay Hill. 
 General Sir Reginald Hewetson, GCB CBE DSO (1908–1993) senior British Army office.
 Charles Keeping (1924–1988), illustrator, children'sauthor and lithographer, lived at 16 Church Road where there is a plaque commemorating him.
 Joseph Thomas Last (1849-1933), English missionary, explorer and naturalist, died here.
 Alexander Muirhead (1848-1920), electrical engineer, credited with recording the first human electrocardiogram, lived and died on Church Road.
 Brian Murphy (born 1932), actor, known for playing George Roper in the sitcom George and Mildred, lived in Shortlands with his wife Linda Regan (see below).
 Linda Regan (born 1949), actress and author, lived in Shortlands with her husband Brian Murphy (see above).
 Peter Ricketts, Baron Ricketts GCMG, GCVO (born 1952), former Permanent Secretary to the Foreign and Commonwealth Office, created Baron Ricketts, of Shortlands in 2017.
 Lord Stamp of Shortlands (1880–1941), the first Chartered Mayor of Beckenham and Chairman of the London, Midland and Scottish Railway. lived and died here when his house on Park Hill Road was bombed in 1941.
 John Veale (1922–2006), English classical composer, born here.
 Charles Paget Wade (1883–1956), English architect, artist-craftsman and poet, was born in Shortlands.

Gallery

References

External links
 Historical images of Shortlands

Districts of the London Borough of Bromley